The Bodo League massacre was a massacre and war crime against communists and alleged sympathizers (many of whom were civilians who had no connection with communism or communists) that occurred in the summer of 1950 during the Korean War. Estimates of the death toll vary. Historians and experts on the Korean War estimate that the full total ranges from at least 60,000–110,000 (Kim Dong-choon) to 200,000 (Park Myung-lim).

The massacre was committed by the government forces of Syngman Rhee and falsely blamed on the communists led by Kim Il-sung. The South Korean government made efforts to conceal the massacre for four decades. Survivors were forbidden by the government from revealing it, under threat of being treated as communist sympathizers; public revelation carried with it the threat of torture and death. During the 1990s and onwards, several corpses were excavated from mass graves, resulting in public awareness of the massacre. Half a century after the massacre, the Truth and Reconciliation Commission investigated what happened in the political violence largely kept hidden from history, unlike the well-publicized North Korean executions of South Korean right-wingers.

Bodo League

South Korean President Syngman Rhee had about 300,000 suspected communist sympathizers or his political opponents enrolled in an official "re-education" movement known as the National Bodo League (or National Rehabilitation and Guidance League, National Guard Alliance, National Guidance Alliance, Gukmin Bodo Yeonmaeng) on the pretext of protecting them from execution. The Bodo League was created by Korean jurists who had collaborated with the Japanese colonial government. Non-communist sympathizers and others were also forced into the Bodo League to fill enlistment quotas.

In June 1949, the South Korean government accused independence activists of being members of the Bodo League. In 1950, just before the outbreak of the Korean War, the first president of South Korea, Syngman Rhee, had about 20,000 alleged communists imprisoned.

Executions

Under the leadership of Kim Il-sung, the Korean People's Army attacked from the north on 25 June 1950, starting the Korean War. According to Kim Mansik, who was a military police superior officer, President Syngman Rhee ordered the execution of people related to either the Bodo League or the South Korean Workers Party on 27 June 1950. The first massacre was started one day later in Hoengseong, Gangwon-do on 28 June. Retreating South Korean forces and anti-communist groups executed the alleged communist prisoners, along with many of the Bodo League members. The executions were performed without any trials or sentencing. Kim Tae Sun, the chief of the Seoul Metropolitan Police, admitted to personally executing at least 12 "communists and suspected communists" after the outbreak of the war. When Seoul was recaptured in late September 1950, an estimated 30,000 South Koreans were summarily deemed collaborators with the North Koreans and shot by ROK forces. At least one US lieutenant colonel is known to have approved the executions at the request of a South Korean regimental commander. Lt. Col. Rollins S. Emmerich, after initially stalling and disapproving, told the South Korean regimental commander Kim Chong-won that he could kill a large number of political prisoners in Busan if the North Korean troops approached so that they would not fall into enemy hands. A mass execution of 3,400 South Koreans did indeed take place near Busan that summer.

United States official documents show that American officers witnessed and photographed the massacre. In another, United States official documents show that John J. Muccio, then United States Ambassador to South Korea, made recommendations to Rhee and Defense Minister Shin Sung-mo that the executions be stopped. American witnesses also reported the scene of the execution of a girl who appeared to be 12 or 13 years old. The massacre was also reported to both Washington and Gen. Douglas MacArthur, who described it as an "internal matter". According to one witness, 40 victims had their backs broken with rifle butts and were shot later. Victims in seaside villages were tied together and thrown into the sea to drown. Retired South Korean Adm. Nam Sang-hui confessed that he authorized 200 victims' bodies to be thrown into the sea, saying, "There was no time for trials for them."

There were also British and Australian witnesses. Great Britain raised this issue with the U.S. at a diplomatic level, causing Dean Rusk, Assistant Secretary of State for Far Eastern Affairs, to inform the British that U.S. commanders were doing "everything they can to curb such atrocities". During the massacre, the British protected their allies and saved some citizens. The Associated Press conducted extensive archival research and found documents classified "secret"  and "filed away" by the Pentagon and State Department in Washington, that had indicated the US commander Gen. Douglas MacArthur made no attempts to curb the summary mass killings.

Daejeon

As the North Korean army was nearing Daejeon, the South Korean paramilitary forces executed around 7000 political prisoners, men, women, and children in mass graves as American officers took photographs which were kept classified until they were released in 1999. This was merely one of many such mass killings conducted by South Korean forces against political prisoners in the first months of the war. Many, including the Daejon Massacre, were propagandistically blamed on the North Koreans.

Aftermath
After the UN offensive in which South Korea recovered its occupied territories, the police and militia groups executed suspected North Korean sympathizers. In October 1950, the Goyang Geumjeong Cave massacre occurred. In December, British troops saved civilians lined up to be shot by South Korean officers and seized one execution site outside Seoul to prevent further massacres. On 4 January 1951, the Ganghwa massacre was committed by South Korean police, who killed 139 civilians in an effort to prevent their collaboration with the North Koreans. According to a South Korean report, South Korea and the U.S. "aided right-wing civil organizations, such as the Ganghwa Self-defense Forces, by providing combat equipment and supplies."

Truth and Reconciliation Commission

In 2008, trenches containing bodies were discovered in Daejeon, South Korea, and other sites. South Korea's Truth and Reconciliation Commission documented testimonies of those still alive and who took part in the executions, including former Daejeon prison guard Lee Joon-young.

Besides photographs of the execution trench sites, the National Archives in Washington D.C. released declassified photographs of U.S. soldiers at execution sites including Daejeon, confirming American military knowledge.

See also
List of massacres in South Korea
Jeju Uprising
Anti-communist mass killings

References

Works cited

External links

Mass Killings in Korea — Commission Probes Hidden History of 1950, Associated Press (Video and Documents)
Unearthing War's Horrors Years Later in South Korea, The New York Times, 3 December 2007.
TRCK confirms hundreds of villagers were massacred during onset of Korean War The commission advises an official state apology and will continue investigations of the National Guard Alliance through the end of the year, Hankyoreh, 17 November 2009.
Truth commission confirms Korean War killings by soldiers and police 3,400 civilians and inmates were shot dead or drowned out of concerns they might cooperate with the People's Army, Hankyoreh, 3 March 2009.

Massacres in South Korea
Massacres committed by South Korea
Political repression in South Korea
War crimes in South Korea
South Korean war crimes
Military scandals
Korean War crimes
1950 in South Korea
Political and cultural purges
Anti-communism in South Korea
Far-right politics in South Korea
Politicides
1950 murders in South Korea
Massacres in 1950